Tiverton Township is one of the twenty-two townships of Coshocton County, Ohio, United States. As of the 2010 census the population was 449.

Geography
Located in the northwestern corner of the county, it borders the following townships:
Richland Township, Holmes County - north
Monroe Township - east
Jefferson Township - southeast corner
Newcastle Township - south
Butler Township, Knox County - southwest corner
Union Township, Knox County - west

No municipalities are located in Tiverton Township.

Name and history
It is the only Tiverton Township statewide.

Tiverton Township was organized in 1824 by the name of Union Township, but by 1825, the name was changed to Tiverton. It was named for Tiverton, Rhode Island, the former hometown of a large share of the first settlers.

Government
The township is governed by a three-member board of trustees, who are elected in November of odd-numbered years to a four-year term beginning on the following January 1. Two are elected in the year after the presidential election and one is elected in the year before it. There is also an elected township fiscal officer, who serves a four-year term beginning on April 1 of the year after the election, which is held in November of the year before the presidential election. Vacancies in the fiscal officership or on the board of trustees are filled by the remaining trustees.

References

External links
County website

Townships in Coshocton County, Ohio
Townships in Ohio